Marco Visconti is an 1834 historical adventure novel by the Italian writer Tommaso Grossi. It is set in the Duchy of Milan in the fourteenth century. Part of the patriotic cultural revival that led to the Risorgimento, Grossi dedicated the work to the Italian Nationalist Giuseppe Mazzini.

Adaptations
In 1925 it was turned into a silent film Marco Visconti directed by Aldo De Benedetti and in 1941 a sound film Marco Visconti by Mario Bonnard  with Carlo Ninchi in the title role. In 1975 Raf Vallone played Visconti in a RAI television series Marco Visconti.

Composer Errico Petrella wrote an 1854 opera based on the novel.

References

Bibliography
 Lucy Morrison, Paula R. Feldman, Staci L. Stone. A Mary Shelley Encyclopedia. Greenwood Publishing Group, 2003
 Goble, Alan. The Complete Index to Literary Sources in Film. Walter de Gruyter, 1999.

1834 novels
Novels by Tommaso Grossi
Italian historical novels
Italian novels adapted into films
Novels set in Milan
Novels set in the 14th century
Novels adapted into operas